A drive bay is a standard-sized area for adding hardware to a computer. Most drive bays are fixed to the inside of a case, but some can be removed.

Over the years since the introduction of the IBM PC, it and its compatibles have had many form factors of drive bays. Four form factors are in common use today, the 5.25-inch, 3.5-inch, 2.5-inch or 1.8-inch drive bays. These names do not refer to the width of the bay itself, but rather to the width of the disks used by the drives mounted in these bays.

Form factors

8.0-inch  
8.0-inch drive bays were found in early IBM computers, CP/M computers, and the TRS-80 Model II. This form factor is obsolete.

5.25-inch  

5.25-inch drive bays are divided into two height specifications, full-height and half-height.

Full-height bays were found in old PCs in the early to mid-1980s. This is the size of the internal (screwed) part of the bay, as the front side is actually . The difference between those widths and the name of the bay size is because it is named after the size of floppy that would fit in those drives, a 5.25-inch-wide square.

They were sometimes used for other things in the past, including hard disk drives (roughly between 10 and 100 MB) and floppy disk drives. As the name indicates, two half-height devices can fit in one full-height bay. Often represented as 5.25-inch, these floppy disk drives are obsolete.

The dimensions of a 5.25-inch floppy drive are specified in the SFF standard specifications which were incorporated into the EIA-741 "Specification for Small Form Factor 133.35 mm (5.25 in) Disk Drives" by the Electronic Industries Association (EIA). Dimensions of 5.25 optical drives are specified in the SFF standard (they are somewhat shorter and not only size of the body is standardized, but also size of the bezel).

3.5-inch  

Those with an opening in the front of the case are generally used for floppy or Zip drives. Hard drives in modern computers are typically mounted in fully internal 4″ (nominally 3.5″) bays. Most modern computers do not come with a floppy drive at all, and may lack any externally accessible 3.5″ bays. There are adapters, sometimes called a "sled", which can be used to mount a 3.5″ device in a 5.25″ bay.

More recently, it is becoming common to use 3.5″ bays for smart card and memory card readers, or for panels with additional USB ports.

The dimensions of a 3.5″ drive are specified in the SFF standard specifications SFF-8300 and SFF-8301 which were incorporated into the EIA-740 specification by the Electronic Industries Association (EIA).

2.5-inch  

However, most laptops have drive bays smaller than the 15 mm specification. 2.5-inch hard drives may range from 7 mm to 15 mm in height, there are two sizes that appear to be prominent. 9.51 mm size drives are predominantly used by laptop manufacturers, however at present 2.5-inch Velociraptor and some higher capacity drives (above 1 TB), are 15 mm in height. The greater height of the 15 mm drives allow more platters and therefore greater data capacities. Many laptop drive bays are designed to be removable trays in which the drives are mounted, to ease removal and replacement.

The dimensions of a 2.5-inch drive are specified in the SFF standard specifications SFF-8200 and SFF-8201 which were incorporated into the EIA-720 specification by the Electronic Industries Association (EIA).

1.8-inch  
1.8-inch bays have two specifications, a 60 mm × 70 mm form factor, and a 54 mm × 78 mm form factor. The actual dimensions of the 60 mm × 70 mm are 2.75 in wide by 0.276–0.374 in high and 2.362 in deep (69.85 mm × 7–9.5 mm × 60 mm). The actual dimensions of the 54 mm × 78 mm are 2.126 in wide by 0.197 or 0.315 in high and 3.091 in deep (54 mm × 5 or 8 mm × 78.5 mm). These drives have been used in small devices including as add-ons to game systems.

The dimensions of a 1.8-inch drive are specified in the SFF standard specifications SFF-8111 and SFF-8120 which were incorporated into the EIA-720 specification by the Electronic Industries Association (EIA).

Usage 
Drive bays are most commonly used to store disk drives, although they can also be used for front-end USB ports, I/O bays, card readers, fans, fan controllers, RAID controllers, tool storage, and other uses. Some computers have a small system monitor LCD mounted in a drive bay.

When installing a drive in a bay, it is usually secured with four screws that hold the drive in the bay, although toolless fasteners are becoming more common. Then, any necessary power, data transfer, and other cables are routed into and connected to the rear of the drive. The drive bay is usually just big enough for the drive to fit inside.  Since computers have 12 V rails on their motherboards, some computer hobbyist websites even sell addons for cigarette lighter receptacles to power or recharge devices made to draw power from automobiles, though USB is already available for charging devices like cell phones and portable media players.

Drive bay-compatible computer case accessories that do not connect to the motherboard or power supply at all are also common, such as small storage drawers or even cup holders.

See also
 Device Bay
 List of disk drive form factors

Notes

References

Computer peripherals